Bostaq (also Romanized as Bosţāq, Basţāq, and Bustāq) is a village in Seh Qaleh Rural District, Seh Qaleh District, Sarayan County, South Khorasan Province, Iran. At the 2006 census, its population was 1,136, in 236 families.

References 

Populated places in Sarayan County